The 1976–77 St. Louis Blues season was the tenth for the franchise in St. Louis, Missouri.  The Blues won the Smythe Division title with a record of 32 wins, 39 losses and nine ties, good for 73 points, and received a first-round bye in the 1977 NHL Playoffs.  However, the Blues were no match for the eventual Stanley Cup champion Montreal Canadiens, as the Montrealers swept the Blues in the quarter-finals.

Offseason

Regular season

Final standings

Schedule and results

Playoffs
The Blues lost to the Montreal Canadiens 4 – 0 in the quarter-finals.

Player statistics

Regular season
Scoring

Goaltending

Playoffs
Scoring

Goaltending

Awards and records

Transactions

Draft picks
St. Louis's draft picks at the 1976 NHL Amateur Draft held in Montreal, Quebec.

Farm teams

See also
1976–77 NHL season

References

External links

St. Louis Blues seasons
St. Louis
St. Louis
St. Louis Blues
St. Louis Blues
Smythe Division champion seasons